Gymnodactylus amarali is a species of lizard in the family Phyllodactylidae. The species is endemic to Brazil.

Etymology
The specific name, amarali, is in honor of Brazilian herpetologist Afrânio Pompílio Gastos do Amaral.

Habitat
The preferred natural habitat of G. amarali is savanna.

Reproduction
G. amarali is oviparous.

References

Further reading
Barbour T (1925). "New Neotropical Lizards". Proceedings of the Biological Society of Washington 38: 101–102. (Gymnodactylus amarali, new species, pp. 101–102).
Cassimiro J, Rodrigues MT (2009). "A new species of lizard genus Gymnodactylus Spix, 1825 (Squamata: Gekkota: Phyllodactylidae) from Serra do Sincorá, northeastern Brazil, and the status of G. carvalhoi Vanzolini, 2005". Zootaxa 2008: 38–52. (Gymnodactylus carvalhoi considered a synonym of Gymnodactylus amarali). (in English, with an abstract in Portuguese).
Vanzolini PE (1953). "Sôbre a diferenciação geográfica de Gymnodactylus geckoides (Sauria, Gekkonidae)". Papéis Avulsos de Zoologia, Museu de Zoologia da Universidade de São Paulo 11 (14): 225–262. (Gymnodactylus geckoides amarali, new status). (in Portuguese).
Vanzolini PE (2005). "On Gymnodactylus amarali Barbour, 1925, with the description of a new species (Sauria, Gekkonidae)". Anais da Academia Brasileira de Ciências 77 (4): 595–611. (Gymnodactylus carvalhoi, new species).

Gymnodactylus
Reptiles of Brazil
Endemic fauna of Brazil
Reptiles described in 1925
Taxa named by Thomas Barbour